A Jackknife to a Swan is the seventh studio album by The Mighty Mighty Bosstones. It was released on July 9, 2002, by SideOneDummy Records. It was recorded over a few weeks in February 2002. This album marked the band's return to an indie label, and was the last album released by the group before their four-year hiatus between 2003 and 2007.

The album title is a reference to both the elegant Olympic high dive and the death of something beautiful. Dicky Barrett has said in interviews that the title of the album upset his mother greatly, as her maiden name was Swan, as well as her mother's.

An earlier version of "The Old School Off The Bright" was originally featured on a promotional EP titled Fabled Barney and The Population given out at the band's Hometown Throwdown in 2002. The promotional version of the album features an alternate version of the song "Seven Ways to Sunday". "Sugar Free" was later featured in the 2006 movie Beerfest.

The track "I want My City Back" is a lament about the loss of The Rathskeller, commonly called The Rat, the club in Boston where the Bosstones got their start.

Release
On March 3, 2002, A Jackknife to a Swan was announced for release in July; it was revealed that the band had signed to SideOneDummy Records. On April 20, 2002, "Mr. Moran" and "Sugar Free" were posted on the label's website. In May and June, the band toured Europe as part of the Deconstruction Tour. A Jackknife to a Swan was made available for streaming the label's website on June 25, 2002, before it was released on July 9, 2002. To promote its release, the band appeared on The Late Late Show and Mohr Sports. On September 26, 2002, a music video for "You Gotta Go!" was posted online. In November and December 2002, the group went on a headlining US tour, with support from Bigwig, Slick Shoes and Simple Plan. On May 21, 2003, the band appeared on Jimmy Kimmel Live!. The following month, they embarked on a brief east coast tour with Voodoo Glow Skulls, the Pietasters, and Catch 22. On June 6, the band appeared on 54321. In October, the band went on a short tour of Germany. In December, the band announced they were going on hiatus.

Reception

The album reached #131 on the Billboard 200, and #9 on the Top Independent Albums.

Track listing
"A Jackknife to a Swan" (Barrett, Burton, Gittleman) – 2:48
"Mr. Moran" (Barrett, Gittleman, Katz) – 3:04
"You Gotta Go!" (Barrett, Gittleman, Katz) – 2:42
"Everybody's Better" (Barrett, Gittleman, Rhodes) – 3:41
"Sugar Free" (Barrett, Gittleman) – 2:44
"I Want My City Back" (Barrett, Katz) – 3:16
"Chasing the Sun Away" (Barrett, Burton) – 3:28
"You Can't Win" (Barrett, Katz) – 3:19
"The Old School Off the Bright" (Barrett, Gittleman) – 2:26
"The Punch Line" (Barrett, Katz) – 3:15
"Go Big" (Barrett, Gittleman) – 2:52
"Shit Outta Luck" (Gittleman) – 2:57
"Seven Ways to Sunday" (Barrett, Gittleman, Katz) – 3:58

Personnel
Dicky Barrett – lead vocals, artwork
Lawrence Katz – guitar, backing vocals
Joe Gittleman – bass, backing vocals
Joe Sirois – drums
Tim "Johnny Vegas" Burton – saxophone
Roman Fleysher – saxophone
Chris Rhodes – trombone
Ben Carr – Bosstone, vocals
Mike Denneen – keyboards, backing vocals
Rolf Langsjoen – trumpet
Jim Fitting – harmonica, backing vocals
Tanya Michelle – backing vocals
John Seymour – backing vocals, producer, mixing, engineer
Matt Tahaney – assistant engineer
Jon Pebsworth – production coordination
Carl Plaster – drum technician
Andrew Lenoski – graphic design
Christian Clayton – cover art
Josh Dalsimer – photography

References

2002 albums
The Mighty Mighty Bosstones albums
SideOneDummy Records albums